Liviu Hodorcă (born July 1, 1961) is a former Romanian rugby union football player. He played as a fullback or as a wing.

Club career
Liviu Hodorcă played for Steaua București and won the national championship 6 times and finishing as a runner-up 3 times.

International career
Liviu Hodorcă earned 11 caps for Romania, from his debut in 1984 to his last game in 1988. He scored 2 tries during his international career, 8 points on aggregate. He was a member of his national side for the 1st Rugby World Cup in 1987 and played in 1 group match in 1987 against Sables in which he scored 4 of his 8 career points.

Honours
Steaua București
 6 times Divizia Națională Champion: 1983–84, 1984–85, 1986–87, 1987–88, 1988–89, 1991–92
 3 times Divizia Națională Runner-Up: 1985–86, 1989–90, 1992–93

External links

Liviu Hodorcă's Profile at Eurosport

References

1961 births
Living people
Romanian rugby union players
Romania international rugby union players
CSA Steaua București (rugby union) players
Rugby union fullbacks
Rugby union wings